Robert Mason Hogg (born January 24, 1967) is the Iowa State Senator from the 33rd District. A Democrat, he has served in the Iowa Senate since 2007 after having served in the Iowa House of Representatives from 2003 to 2007. He ran in the Democratic primary for the 2016 United States Senate election in Iowa, but he lost to former Iowa Lieutenant Governor Patty Judge. In June 2021, Hogg announced his intention to not seek re-election to his seat in 2022.

Background
Hogg was born in Iowa City in 1967, the son of Robert (Bob) and Carol Ladd Hogg. He received his B.A. from the University of Iowa and his J.D. and M.A. from the University of Minnesota.

Political career

State Legislature
Hogg currently serves on several committees in the Iowa Senate - the Appropriations committee; the Ways and Means committee; the Environment & Energy Independence committee, where he is vice chair; the Judiciary committee, where he is vice chair; and the Rebuild Iowa committee, where he is chair. He also serves as vice chair of the Justice System Appropriations Subcommittee.  , he was the only lawyer in the Iowa Senate.

Hogg was elected in 2006 with 14,112 votes (59%), defeating Republican opponent Renee Schulte. He was reelected in 2010 and 2014.

Hogg served as minority leader of the Iowa Senate for a little less than a year. He was replaced by Janet Petersen in 2017.

U.S. Senate campaign

On July 8, 2014, Hogg announced that he had formed a committee to explore a potential run for United States Senate in 2016 against Republican incumbent Chuck Grassley. Later in 2015, Hogg announced his candidacy. Hogg received the endorsement of over 60 state lawmakers, including Iowa Senate President Pam Jochum and Senate Majority Leader Michael Gronstal. However, he lost the primary election to Patty Judge, who ultimately lost the general election to incumbent Senator Chuck Grassley.

Publications

In 2013, Robb published America's Climate Century: What Climate Change Means for America in the 21st Century, a self-published but well-received account of the challenges society is confronting in the face of a changing climate.

References

External links

Senator Rob Hogg official Iowa Legislature site
Senator Rob Hogg official Iowa General Assembly site
State Senator Rob Hogg official constituency site
Rob Hogg Exploratory Committee exploratory committee website
 

1967 births
Living people
Democratic Party Iowa state senators
Democratic Party members of the Iowa House of Representatives
University of Iowa alumni
University of Minnesota Law School alumni
Politicians from Iowa City, Iowa
Politicians from Cedar Rapids, Iowa
Iowa lawyers
21st-century American politicians